The 10th Guards Motor Rifle Division was a division of the Soviet Ground Forces. The full name of its predecessor division was the 10th Guards Rifle Pechengskii, Twice Order of the Red Banner, Order of Alexander Nevsky, Order of the Red Star Division. (Russian: 10ая гвардейская стрелковая Печенгский, дважды орденом Красного Знамени, орденом Александра Невского, орденом Красной звезда дивизия.) The 10th Guards Rifle Division was formed from the 52nd Rifle Division in late 1941.

History
In 1939 the 52nd Rifle Division took part in the Soviet invasion of Poland, then during the Winter War in the Battle of Petsamo.

At the outbreak of Operation Barbarossa the division was still in the far north, near Murmansk. As part of 14th Army it defended against the German Mountain Corps Norway's assault towards the port which began on 19 June 1941, and was finally brought to a halt along the Litsa River line on 21 Sept. In recognition of its role in the successful defense of Murmansk, the division was renamed and reorganized as the 10th Guards Rifle Division on 26 Dec, with the following order of battle:
 24th Guards Rifle Regiment
 28th Guards Rifle Regiment
 35th Guards Rifle Regiment
 29th Guards Artillery Regiment
It was one of the few Guards formations formed or deployed by the Red Army in the Arctic during the war.

During the defense the 10th Guards was engaged in 150 fights of local importance. At the end of April 1942, it began a counterattack which was unsuccessful. The counterattack failed due to severe weather conditions and a strong snowstorm on the previous day. Along with most units of the static Karelian Front, during the next two years the division operated at minimal strength in its rifle units in order to conserve manpower for the main front to the south; however it also formed a divisional ski battalion for rear area security.

In Sept. – Oct. 1944 the division was subordinated to 131st Rifle Corps, itself reporting to 14th Army. Beginning on 7 October 1944, it participated in the Petsamo-Kirkenes Operation and was in the first echelon advancing to the building on Mount Small Karikvayvish and seized a bridgehead on the west bank of the Titovka River on 8 Oct. After four days of fighting for the Luostari on 14 Oct 10 Guards crossed the Pechenga River west of Kakkuri and participated in the liberation of Pechenga. After the liberation of Pechenga the division attacked Kirkenes, supported by the 378th Guards Heavy Self-Propelled Artillery Regiment. Once the Germans had been forced back into Norway the offensive came to a halt and Karelian Front went into STAVKA reserve.

In December the division was reassigned to 19th Army, which in turn was assigned to Gen. K.K. Rokossovski's 2nd Belorussian Front. It crossed Poland and was positioned in Ostrow-Mazowiecki in January 1945. On 26 February, during the East Pomeranian Offensive, the division moved from Baldenberg and turned northeast to Rummelsburg and on 3 March captured Rummelsburg.

After helping to take Gdynia on 31 March the division joined forces with 1st Polish Tank Brigade and attacked Zagorje, east of Janowo, located on the peninsula formed by the Gulf Puttsger Vic and the river Rod. By the end of April, the 10th Guards was positioned in the forests northeast of Treptow and covered the coast of Baltic Sea from Kohlberg to Valddivinov. The division mopped-up the forests, eliminating small scattered groups of German troops. In the last days of the war, the division crossed the delta of the river Oder at Swinemünde and was engaged in fighting on the island of Usedom before the German surrender.

Postwar Service
In the postwar period it moved to Akhaltsikhe in the Georgian SSR, joining the Transcaucasus Military District. It was active there by 1 January 1947, being converted into a mountain rifle division in 1949. In 1962 it became the 10th Guards Motor Rifle Division, part of 31st Army Corps. The division was disbanded in March 1992, with its lineage, honours and awards transferred to the 67th Motor Rifle Division in the Far East, which was redesignated as the 115th Guards Motor Rifle Division.

Subordination September 1944 – May 1945

Order of battle

 24th Guards Rifle Regiment
 28th Guards Rifle Regiment of the Red Banner
 35th Guards Rifle Regiment
 29th Guards Artillery Regiment
 14th Guards Anti-tank Battalion
 4th Guards Anti-aircraft Battery (up to 4 June 1943)
 21st Guards Mortar Battalion (until 29 October 1942)
 13th Guards Reconnaissance Company
 1st Guards Sapper Battalion
 8th Guards Signal Company
 12th Guards Medical/Sanitation Battalion
 7th Guards Chemical Protection Company
 5th Guards Truck Company
 6th Guards Field Bakery Company
 3rd Guards Veterinary Company

Commanders 
 Finnish, Nicola Nicholas (1941), Major General 
 Pashkovskii, Michael Kazimirovich (26 December 1941 – 2 March 1942), Colonel
 Krasilnikov, Daniel Yefimovich (3 March 1942 – 23 July 1942), Major General
 Khudalov, Chariton A. (24 July 1942 – 29 November 1943), Colonel, as of 27 November 1942 Major General
 Grebenkin, Fedor Alekseevich (30 November 1943 – 23 March 1944), Colonel
 Khudalov, Chariton A. (24 March 1944 – 9 May 1945), Major General

Awards and name

Heroes of the Soviet Union

Memory 
 Murmansk School-Museum from the School No. 26.
 Museum of professional construction school No. 48 of Moscow – Museum "Heroic Path 10th Guards Rifle Division"

References 

 
 Khudalov J.A., At the Edge of the Continent, 2nd Ed., Ordzhonikidze, 1978
 Veschezersky G.A., At Cold Rocks, Moscow, 1965
 Rumyantsev N.M., The Defeat of the Enemy in the Arctic (1941–1944), Moscow, 1963

External links 
Directory
Web-Directory of the society "Memory" from Voronezh University
The Battle membership of the Soviet Army, 1941–1945
The list No. 5 of rifle, mountain rifle and mechanized divisions as part of the active army in the Great Patriotic War of 1941–1945.
Some statistical materials about history of the Great Patriotic War

G010
Military units and formations established in 1941
Military units and formations disestablished in 1992
Military units and formations awarded the Order of the Red Banner